5 Cheyne Walk is a Grade II* listed house on Cheyne Walk, Chelsea, London, built in 1718.

The miser John Camden Neild lived there from 1814 until his death in 1852.

5 Cheyne Walk is now the residence of the Cypriot High Commissioner to the UK.

References

Buildings and structures on the River Thames
Grade II* listed buildings in the Royal Borough of Kensington and Chelsea
Grade II* listed houses in London
Houses completed in 1718
Houses in the Royal Borough of Kensington and Chelsea
1718 establishments in England